With These Hands may refer to:
With These Hands (album and song)a 1996 release by Alejandro Escovedo
 With These Hands (film), a 1950 documentary film
 With These Hands (album), a 1985 album by The Farmer's Boys
 With These Hands..., a 1956 album by Randy Weston
 "With These Hands" (song), a 1950 song with music by Abner Silver and words by Benny Davis, recorded by many artists.
 With These Hands, a 1951 short story by Cyril M. Kornbluth